Tait was an American Christian rock band formed by Michael Tait, one of the members of dc Talk and the lead singer of Newsboys since 2009.

History

Pre-formation of Tait (1996–1999)
In 1996, dc Talk member Michael Tait met Chad Chapin and the two became close friends and began to write songs together. After a few years, Michael created his own cover band, a funky hard rock group named Curious George. He toured with Chapin and had a few concerts, performing music from Pearl Jam to King's X and The 77s. Afterward was when Tait and Chapin decided that they would eventually get a more permanent music group of their own together and tour the world.

Michael and Tait member Pete Stewart also had a friendship before the band's inception. After Stewart had assisted dc Talk by playing guitar on their album Supernatural, Tait and Stewart co-wrote the song "Uphill Battle" which was featured on ForeFront Records' Ten: The Birthday Album. When Stewart's alternative metal group Grammatrain disbanded in 1998, he went on to co-produce his own solo album with the help of Tait.

Empty (2000-2002)
When dc Talk went on hiatus around 1999, Michael started working unofficially with his own music. As his solo project slowly began to come together, Michael quickly thought of the friendships that within the past few years had become a fundamental part of his career. Pete Stewart came to join Michael, along with the Chapin brothers, Chad and Lonnie who in 1996 had moved to Nashville, Tennessee, to see where they could get in the music business. The band officially formed in 2000 and was named Tait after Michael's father, Rev. Nathel Tait.

After about a year in the studio, the band released their first album entitled Empty. It was generally well received, and the album even broke onto the Top Contemporary Christian charts. The album featured songs that handled subjects like skepticism of others ("Spy"), racism ("American Tragedy") (this album was controversial because of the use of a racial slur in the middle of this song) and Michael's outpouring of grief of losing his father, sister and brother all in the same year ("Unglued").

Lose This Life (2003–2007)
After the release of the first album, Pete Stewart took his leave from the group. He was replaced by nineteen-year-old guitarist Justin York. Once again the band went into the recording studio in 2002 and worked through 2003 to release a new album. The group was successful, and in November they released Dove Award-winning Lose This Life.

The album proved that the group had matured into a much more aggressive hard rock sound compared to Empty’s more relaxed easy-listening music. Around the time the album was released, band members also participated in the production of !Hero, a rock opera which modernized the life and times of Jesus Christ.

Within the past few years the band has toured on and off, many times with other CCM artists. When asked about the set-backs of recent band member changes, Tait has stated that "I think [with him] spearheading [the band] — if [he takes] off, then the band does change. If a member changes here and there, it does not affect [the band] a bit…. it does not change a bit of [his] vision for this band."

Hiatus (2007–2009)
Tait has not toured since October 6, 2007, and as of March 9, 2009, Michael Tait has been officially announced as the lead singer of the popular Christian pop rock group Newsboys. Tait had initially planned to release a third album, Loveology, announced in 2006 that was to include music that was described as "Stevie Wonder meets Maroon 5 meets Lenny Kravitz." Music for this album including a song titled "Glimmer" has been recorded, but after two years of silence, the album remains unreleased and its future remains uncertain.

Tait has said that he is still working on Loveology with, among others, Ben Moody. However, he said it will likely be different from the original album he was working on.

Former band members

Michael Tait – vocals, piano (2001–2007)
Chad Chapin – drums, percussion (2001–2007)
Evan Weatherford – guitar (2004–2007)
Jordan Hester – bass (2004–2007)
Pete Stewart – guitar, keyboards (2001–2002)
Justin York – guitar (2002–2004)
Brian Nutter – guitar (2004–2005)
Lonnie Chapin – bass guitar (2001–2004)
Dave Clo – guitar (2005)
Brian Tait – keyboards (2005)

Discography
 Empty (2001)
 Lose This Life (2003)

Chart History

References

External links
Tait official website [Website is defunct] 
dc Talk official website
dcTalkSolo website

Christian rock groups from Tennessee
Musical groups established in 2001
Musical groups disestablished in 2007